Chung Yoon-hoi (born 1955) is a South Korean businessman. He was the chief of staff to president Park Geun-hye when she was a second-term lawmaker.

Tatsuya Kato, former Seoul bureau chief of the Sankei Shimbun newspaper, wrote an article alleging that after the sinking of MV Sewol ferry, president Park was incommunicado for seven important hours, and could have been with Chung at that time. However, he was accused by Korean prosecutors for defamation of President Park.

Chung married Choi Soon-sil in 1995. They divorced in July 2014. His daughter, Chung Yoo-ra, is a gold medalists in equestrian.

References 

South Korean businesspeople
People from Gangwon Province, South Korea
Living people
1955 births
Park Geun-hye